The Acklin Store, on New Mexico State Road 90 near San Lorenzo, Grant County, New Mexico, was listed on the National Register of Historic Places in 1988.

It is significant for its association with Henry Acklin, a miner from Georgetown, who moved to this area and built this store in about 1920.  He then built a number of rental houses and the area became the commercial center for the mid-Mimbres Valley and became known as Acklin Hill.

It is a two-story L-shaped building with a one-story section in the L.  It is made of adobe with stucco in parts and clapboard elsewhere.  Although built of adobe, it has a relatively normal vernacular commercial style, with large store display windows and a centered door.

It was listed on the National Register as part of a 1988 study of historic resources in the Mimbres Valley of Grant County.

References

Commercial buildings on the National Register of Historic Places in New Mexico
National Register of Historic Places in Grant County, New Mexico